Industrial area may refer to:
 Industrial district
 Industrial park
 Industrial region

See also
 Industrial Area (Doha)